Space Academy is an American science fiction television series produced by Filmation that originally aired Saturday mornings on the CBS television network, from September 10 to December 17, 1977. (Repeats ran on and off until September 1, 1979.) A total of 15 half-hour episodes were made.

Cast
The program starred veteran actor Jonathan Harris, best known as Dr. Zachary Smith of Lost in Space; co-starring were Pamelyn Ferdin, Ric Carrott, Maggie Cooper, Brian Tochi, Ty Henderson, and Eric Greene. The program featured a pint-sized robot called "Peepo", a radio-controlled machine voiced by Erika Scheimer talking through a pitch-shifter with regenerative delay.

Ferdin and Tochi had been among the child actors who played a group of children orphaned by an evil being masquerading as an angel in the 1968 Star Trek episode And the Children Shall Lead.

Guest stars included Lawrence "Larry" Dobkin; Dena Dietrich ("Mother Nature" in the Chiffon margarine TV commercials of the 1960s and 70s); George DiCenzo; Dallas McKennon; and Howard Morris.

Concepts and characters

Established in the "star year" 3732, the Space Academy, located on an asteroid, brought together the best of young minds, including several with special skills and abilities, to explore the mysteries of space.

 Commander Isaac Gampu (Jonathan Harris) was the head of the academy. His many years of space exploration exposed him to conditions that immensely slowed his aging process; though appearing to be in his sixties or seventies, his true age was well over 300 years old, giving him a unique perspective on history and some ideal qualifications as a teacher. He oversaw the activities of three student exploratory teams, the Red, Blue and Gold Teams (although the main characters were all members of the Blue Team).
 Chris Gentry (Ric Carrott) and Laura Gentry (Pamelyn Ferdin) were the captain and co-captain, respectively, of the academy's Blue Team. The siblings (Chris was the elder) had highly developed telekinetic and other psychic powers. Laura was attracted to Matt Prentiss (John Berwick, later "Rex Ruthless" on Hero High), the occasionally-seen leader of the Red Team.
 Adrian Pryce-Jones (the late Maggie Cooper) was number three in the Blue Team's chain of command and Chris's love interest.
 Paul Jerome (the late Ty Henderson), a highly intelligent transferee from the Red Team, was raised on an Earth colony. He was number four in the Blue Team's chain of command (although Paul is introduced as an established academy member in the first episode, he is reintroduced in the second episode as if he were a new character; conversely Loki, introduced in the first episode as a new admission, is reintroduced in the second episode as a long-established member. This continuity error was acknowledged in the information booklet accompanying the series' DVD release).
 Tee Gar Soom (Brian Tochi), number five in Blue Team's chain of command, had superhuman physical strength and continued the martial arts traditions of his Asian ancestors. He augmented these abilities with newer disciplines, some of which originated on other planets.  His major was medicine, and he was often called on to treat other students who were sick.
 Loki (Eric Greene) was a young orphan discovered in the first episode on the dying world of Zalon. A playful prankster, Loki could teleport and could see well beyond the visible spectrum normally accessible by Earth humans. His frequent catchphrase was "Camelopardus!" 
  
As with much of children's television in the 1970s, lessons and morals were taught in each episode. These included wide-ranging concepts, such as that the superpowers possessed by some academy students were not a cure-all for problems, and that even the old and wise could make mistakes. As the students encountered members of extraterrestrial races, even mutated descendants of Earth colonists in space, they came to further develop their wisdom and understanding of diversity throughout the universe.

The spaceships commonly seen in the series were called "Seekers" and were used much like a spacebound van or bus. The Seeker's nose was a re-used prop from the earlier Filmation series Ark II.

One term of jargon unique to the program was "ORACO" ("Orders Received And Carried Out"), used when orders were acknowledged by academy personnel.

Episodes

Home media
BCI Eclipse LLC (under its Ink & Paint classic animation entertainment brand) (under license from Entertainment Rights), released Space Academy: The Complete Series as a 4-disc Region 1 DVD box set on January 16, 2007. The collection presented episodes uncut, remastered and in order of their original airdates, and included special features about the making of the show.

Savor Ediciones, S.A. released Space Academy: La Serie Completa as a 3-disc Region 2 DVD box set on October 28, 2009. Unlike the BCI set, this release only contains the episodes, no bonus features. Being a Region 2 release for Spain, the soundtrack is the dubbed Spanish version. Unfortunately, the original English soundtrack was not included, even as a secondary option. The discs are encoded in the PAL video format, which is the same format as the currently-existing masters, so there is a small amount of additional picture area not present on the NTSC conversions released by BCI Eclipse.

Spin-off

In 1978, a spin-off of Space Academy, Jason of Star Command, debuted. Initially a serialized segment of Tarzan and the Super 7, it starred Craig Littler and James Doohan, with Sid Haig as the villain. Star Command was described as a special section of the Space Academy; the show used the same sets, costumes and special effects as the parent program.

Merchandise

In 1977, Aviva Toy Company manufactured and F.W. Woolworth distributed a set of four eight-and-a-half inch action figures based on Space Academy characters.  The dolls in this set included Issac [sic] Gampu  (described as "Instructor in 'Space Academy'"), Tee Gar Soom ("Almost Super Human Strength"), Chris Gentry ("Member of Space Academy") and Loki ("Everybody's Mascot").

Also available for the figures were special "adventure outfits", sold separately.

References

 Companion booklet to Space Academy: The Complete Series 4-DVD box set (BCI Eclipse 2007).

External links

CBS original programming
1977 American television series debuts
1979 American television series endings
1970s American children's television series
1970s American high school television series
1970s American science fiction television series
American children's adventure television series
American children's science fiction television series
Television series set in the future
Television series about teenagers
Television series by Filmation
Television series by Universal Television
Television series set on fictional planets
Space adventure television series